Ende Gelände 2018 were a series of events of a mass movement for climate justice in the  in Germany. The non-violent direct action civil disobedience events were targeted against coal-based power generation through RWE Power AG and demanded the "immediate fossil fuel phase-out" based on climate justice and climate change mitigation.

More than  people took part in the protests.

See also 
 Ende Gelände
 Ende Gelände 2017
 Ende Gelände 2019
 Extinction Rebellion (XR)
 School strike for climate / Fridays for Future (FFF)
 Earth Strike
 Commission on Growth, Structural Change and Employment
 Energy transition (in Germany)
 Fossil fuel divestment
 Climate disobedience

References

External links 
 "So viele wie nie" - Video of "graswurzel.tv"
 "So lange wie noch nie" - Video of "graswurzel.tv"

2018 in Germany
2018 in the environment
2018 protests
Occupations (protest)
Climate change in Germany
Climate change policy
Coal mining
Coal in Germany
Demonstrations
Direct action
Environmental protests in Germany
Mining in Germany
RWE
Surface mining